= Vercelli Airfield =

Vercelli Airfield Aeroporto di Vercelli
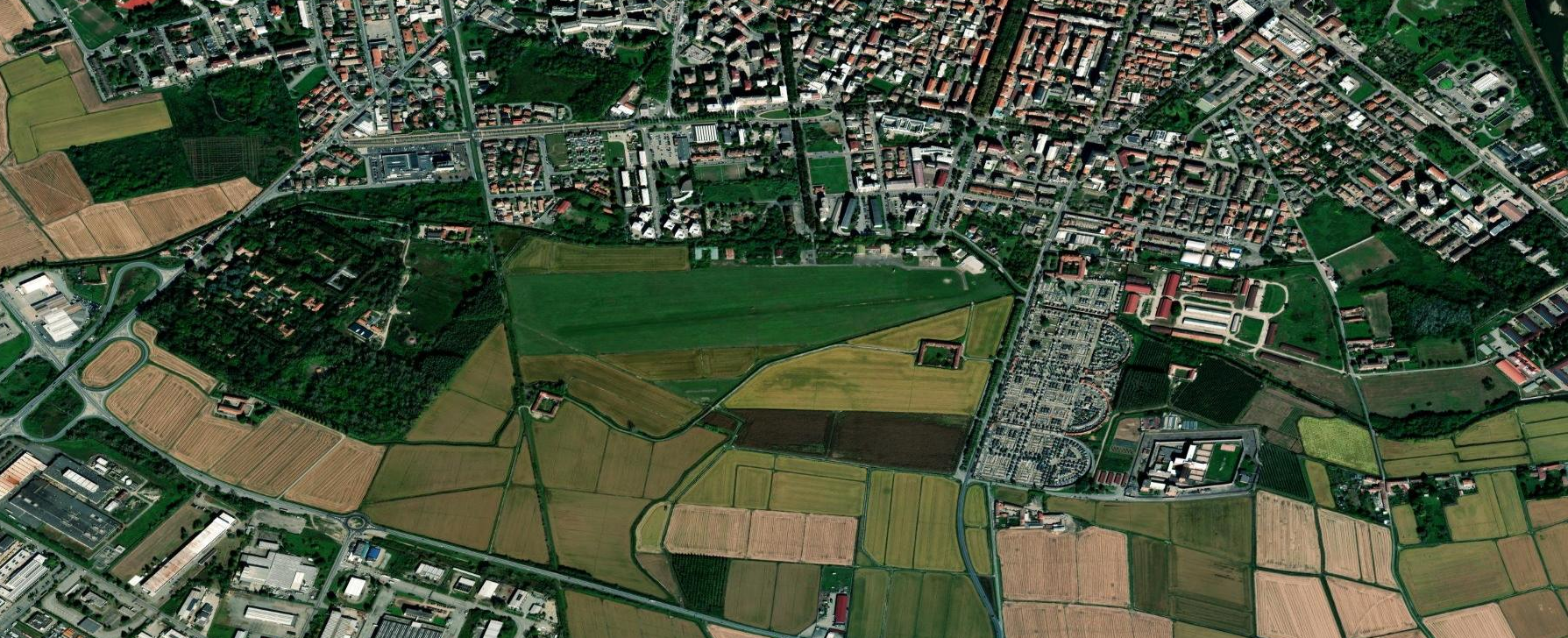
- IATA: none; ICAO: LILI

Summary
- Airport type: Civil
- Operator: Aero Club Vercelli "Marilla Rigazio"
- Serves: Vercelli
- Location: Vercelli
- Elevation AMSL: 127 m (417 ft)
- Coordinates: 45°18′40″N 8°25′3″E

Map
- Location of airport in Italy

Runways
Direction	Length		Surface
Direction	ft	m	Surface
09/27		560	Asphalt

Vercelli Airfield is an airfield located south of Vercelli, Italy. The structure is equipped with a grass track with 09/27 orientation. The airport is managed by the Aero Club Vercelli "Marilla Rigazio" and carries out activities according to the rules of visual flight.

Vercelli Airfield was inaugurated in 1928.
